Randy Robbins may refer to:

Randy Robbins (American football) (born 1962), former NFL football player
Randy Robbins (director), American television director